Kulai-NSE Highway or Jalan Alor Bukit, Federal Route 399 is a major highway in Johor state, Malaysia. It is the only federal road in Malaysia constructed as a 2-lane freeway by an expressway concessionaire company (PLUS Expressway Berhad) as a part of the North–South Expressway project. It is also a main route to North–South Expressway Southern Route via Kulai Interchange.

List of interchanges 

Highways in Malaysia